Clinton High School is a comprehensive public high school in Clinton, Arkansas, United States that serves grades 10 through 12. It is one of three public high schools in Van Buren County and the only high school managed by the Clinton School District4.

The school, as the only high school of its district, serves Clinton, most of Dennard, Scotland, and Alread.

Academics 
The assumed course of study is the Smart Core curriculum developed by the Arkansas Department of Education.  Students may engage in regular and Advanced Placement (AP) coursework and exams that provide an opportunity for college credit prior to graduation. Clinton High School is accredited by ADE.The school also has a very good alternative learning environment program (ALE) for grades 8-12 put on by arch ford that is across the street from the main high school building it is a smaller setting and more 1 on 1 with its students.

Extracurricular activities 
The Clinton High School mascot is the Yellowjacket with school colors of black and gold.

Athletics 
For 2012–14, the Clinton Yellowjackets participate in the 4A Classification from the 4A Region 2 Conference for interscholastic activities administered by the Arkansas Activities Association including football, baseball, basketball (boys/girls), cheer, dance, cross country, golf (boys/girls), softball, and track and field.

Notable alumni
The number in parentheses indicates the year of graduation.

 John Hargis (1992)—Olympic Gold Medalist; swimmer and swim coach.
 Karen R. Baker (1981)-Elected to the Arkansas State Supreme Court in 2010.

References

External links
 

Public high schools in Arkansas
Schools in Van Buren County, Arkansas